Belenli can refer to:

 Belenli, Bayramören
 Belenli, Çınar
 Belenli, Kahta
 Belenli, Kaş
 Belenli, Kemer